Aleksinsky District is an administrative district (raion), one of the twenty-three in Tula Oblast, Russia. It is located in the northwest of the oblast. Its administrative center is the town of Aleksin. Population: 74,326 (2010 Census);  The population of Aleksin accounts for 83.1% of the district's total population.

Administrative and municipal status
Within the framework of administrative divisions, Aleksinsky District is one of the twenty-three in the oblast. The town of Aleksin serves as its administrative center.

As a municipal division, the territory of the district is split between two municipal formations—Aleksin Urban Okrug, to which the town of Aleksin and 154 of the administrative district's rural localities belong, and Novogurovsky Urban Okrug, which covers the rest of the administrative district's territory, including the work settlement of Novogurovsky.

References

Notes

Sources



Districts of Tula Oblast